Jesper Garnell (born 22 April 1958 in Dalum, Odense) is a retired male lightweight boxer from Denmark, who represented his native country at the 1980 Summer Olympics in Moscow, Soviet Union.

There he was eliminated in the second round by Mongolia's Galsandorj Batbileg on points (1-4) after having defeated Sylvain Rajefiarison (Madagascar) in the first round. Garnell was one out of three boxers representing Denmark at the 1980 Summer Olympics, the other ones being Ole Svendsen (welterweight) and Michael Madsen (light heavyweight).

References
 sports-reference

1958 births
Living people
Lightweight boxers
Boxers at the 1980 Summer Olympics
Olympic boxers of Denmark
Sportspeople from Odense
Danish male boxers